Mason is an unincorporated community in Lyon County, Nevada, United States.

History
A post office was established at Mason in 1908, and remained in operation until 1961. The community was named after Henry "Hock" Mason, a pioneer citizen.

Notable people
Edward Cornelius Reed Jr., United States District Court judge

Notes

Unincorporated communities in Lyon County, Nevada
Unincorporated communities in Nevada